Paul A. Calandra (born May 13, 1970) is a Canadian politician who has served as a minister in the Ontario provincial cabinet since 2019. Calandra has been the government house leader for the Progressive Conservative (PC) Party since 2019, minister of legislative affairs since 2021 and minister of long-term care since 2022. Calandra represents Markham—Stouffville in the Legislative Assembly of Ontario.

He previously sat in the federal House of Commons from 2008 to 2015 for the Conservative Party, serving as a parliamentary secretary to Prime Minister Stephen Harper from 2013 to 2015. In the 2015 federal election, he was a candidate in the Markham—Stouffville riding, created as a result of the federal electoral redistribution of 2012, and was defeated by Jane Philpott.

Education
Calandra studied history with a minor in political science at Carleton University. His claim on his campaign website in 2007 to have "complet(ed) full-time university studies" was controversial since, at that time he had not graduated. In an interview with WhiStle Radio on September 29, 2015, he stated that he left school in the early '90s before completing his degree and had later obtained the remaining credits required to graduate by correspondence course. He obtained bachelor's degree from Carleton in November 2008.

Early career
Prior to entering politics, Calandra worked in the insurance business from 1995 to 2003. He then served as chief of staff to Steve Gilchrist, who was the PC MPP for Scarborough East in the Mike Harris government.

Family dispute
In 2005, Calandra was involved in a family dispute. In the early 2000s, he had power of attorney to manage his mother's affairs. In a lawsuit filed by his sisters, it was claimed the power of attorney had been revoked by his mother months before her death in August 2005, but Calandra had invoked it for personal gain. Calandra's sisters alleged that he had charged $8,000 to his mother's credit card without her knowledge. They further alleged that, when confronted about the charges by his sister Concetta, Calandra suggested that he should kill Concetta. In his statement of defence, Calandra said that the charges had been authorized. The sisters also alleged that Calandra took $25,000 from his mother to pay taxes, but instead wrote the cheque to himself and left the taxes unpaid. Calandra claimed in his statement of defense that the money was given to him by his mother "freely, without pretext, and of her own volition." A document filed on September 8, 2008, the first full day of the 2008 federal election campaign, said that the parties had settled the case out of court.

Politics
Calandra ran as the Canadian Alliance candidate in the 2000 federal election in the riding of Toronto riding of Scarborough East. He was defeated by Liberal incumbent John McKay by 16,460 votes. He ran eight years later in the 2008 federal election as the Conservative candidate in the York Region riding of Oak Ridges—Markham. He defeated Liberal incumbent Lui Temelkovski by 545 votes. He was re-elected in 2011 defeating Temelkovski again, this time by 20,680 votes.

Following his election in 2008, in Calandra's first term he sat on the Access to Information, Privacy, and Ethics Committee, Citizenship and Immigration Committee, and the Government Operations and Estimates Committee.

During this term he also introduced two private member's bills. On June 19, 2009, he introduced ‘An Act to Change the Name of the Electoral District of Oak Ridges—Markham, and on March 11, 2011, he introduced ‘An Act Respecting the Establishment of a National Strategy for the Purchase and Sale of Second-Hand Precious Metal Articles'. Neither of these bills proceeded past first reading.

Parliamentary secretary to the minister of Canadian heritage and official languages
He was re-elected in the 2011 election and was subsequently appointed parliamentary secretary to the minister of Canadian heritage and official languages where he sat on the Standing Committee for Canadian Heritage and formerly the Standing Committee on Bill C-11. In 2012 Calandra was forced to repay $5,000 that his riding association had received in donations at a fundraiser held at the home of Kirupalini Kirupakaran, at which he had been present. Kirupakaran was the sister of the CEO of WorldBand Media Inc., which was one of the firms lobbying the Canadian Radio-television and Telecommunications Commission (CRTC) for the 88.1 FM frequency allocation in the Toronto area. She had pledged to the CRTC that she would invest up to $2,000,000 in WorldBand Media should it win the competition. The CRTC at the time was under the Department of Canadian Heritage thereby giving rise to allegations of a conflict of interest. Following questions from The Globe and Mail, and despite initially denying any donations had been received from anyone associated with the bid, Calandra eventually repaid donations made by five people listed with the CRTC as proposed WorldBand investors.

In the same year a controversial $500 donation was made to Calandra's riding association by Stanislaus Antony at another fundraising event. Antony was leading a competing bid for 88.1 FM with the CRTC for a station to be called STAN FM. Immediately prior to The Globe and Mail's publication of the article questioning the WorldBand donations Calandra confirmed that his riding association was reviewing the Antony contribution. The donation was not returned.

Parliamentary secretary to the prime minister
In September 2013 Paul Calandra was appointed parliamentary secretary to the prime minister and minister of intergovernmental affairs.

As parliamentary secretary Calandra often fielded questions on behalf of Prime Minister Harper during the Senate Scandal (2013). This brought Calandra under a great deal of scrutiny for his perceived non-answers, deflections, and attacks, and prompted widespread backlash in the form of media articles, social media postings, vandalization of his Wikipedia page, and being covered on the Rick Mercer Report. On September 23, 2014, Calandra's repeated refusal to acknowledge questions about Canada's involvement in Iraq led the Opposition leader, Thomas Mulcair to question the integrity of the speaker of the House, Andrew Scheer, who did not intervene. Instead of giving an answer on Iraq, Calandra insisted on reiterating Canada's commitment to Israel, prompting Global News to describe the exchange as "unreal", and The Globe and Mail publishing an editorial stating "to call Mr. Calandra a clown is to do a disservice to the ancient profession of painted-face buffoonery". On September 26, 2014, Calandra gave a tearful speech in Parliament in order to "unconditionally, unreservedly apologize to the House".

2015 general election
Following an interview on CBC's Power & Politics about the Mike Duffy trial, Peter Mansbridge referred to Calandra's responses as being "The Full Calandra", as he felt that he was answering different questions from those posed. This led to a Twitter hashtag of the same name Following this, the comedian Mark Critch tweeted that Calandra was "a slippery tool". Subsequently, Calandra blocked Critch from accessing his posts on Twitter. Critch then offered to donate money to charity for any user who tweeted similar messages to Calandra. Other people blocked by Calandra on Twitter included parliamentary press gallery reporters Alex Boutilier, Lee Berthiaume, along with TheTyee.ca reporter Jeremy Nuttall and Jim Mason, the editor (@stouffeditor) of the Stouffville Sun-Tribune, the local newspaper in Calandra's riding, who had been blocked in 2014. Calandra later said that blocking of Mason had been accidental and subsequently unblocked him. The habit of Conservative party members blocking those who disagreed with them on social media became referred to as #conblocked.

Calandra entered the debate on the future of the Pickering Airport lands that had previously been expropriated by the Government of Canada. He expressed support for a Buttonville sized airport on the lands in contrast to the position taken by all his opponents.

He was defeated by Jane Philpott in the Markham—Stouffville riding, created as a result of the federal electoral redistribution of 2012. In a CBC interview he blamed his loss on the Conservative Party's focus on identity issues, specifically the Niqāb issue, the stripping of citizenship from dual nationals and the launching of a barbaric cultural practices hot line, claiming that voters were "confused" about the application of Bill C-24.

Entry into provincial politics

In September 2016 Calandra announced that he would be seeking the Ontario PC nomination for the provincial riding of Markham-Stouffville. On November 11, it was announced that Calandra won the nomination and would represent the PCs in the 2018 provincial election.

Calandra had claimed to be a "big fan" and "good friend" of erstwhile PC leader Patrick Brown, since 2008 but, following Brown's sudden resignation on January 25, 2018 due to allegations of sexual misconduct, Calandra threw his support behind Caroline Mulroney in the subsequent leadership contest despite Brown's re-entry into the race. Three weeks later, however, when it appeared  that Mulroney's bid was struggling, he switched allegiances once again to back Christine Elliott.

In the 2018 Ontario election, Calandra won the riding of Markham-Stouffville, defeating Liberal incumbent Helena Jaczek. On June 29, 2018, Calandra was appointed as the parliamentary assistant to the minister of energy, northern development and mines (energy). He was re-elected in the 2022 Ontario general election with 48.42% of the vote.

Provincial cabinet 
Calandra was appointed to the provincial cabinet of Premier Doug Ford in 2019 as government house leader and minister without portfolio. He was later promoted to a full minister in 2021, becoming the first minister of legislative affairs. In 2022, Calandra assumed the role of minister of long-term care, following the resignation of Rod Philips.

Electoral record

Cabinet positions

References

Notes

Citations

External links
Paul Calandra, Constituency Office Website

1970 births
21st-century Canadian politicians
Members of the Executive Council of Ontario
Canadian politicians of Italian descent
Carleton University alumni
Conservative Party of Canada MPs
Living people
Members of the House of Commons of Canada from Ontario
People from Markham, Ontario
People from Whitchurch-Stouffville
Progressive Conservative Party of Ontario MPPs